Baliya is a village in Kailali District in the Seti Zone of western Nepal. At the time of the 1991 Nepal census it had a population of 17512 living in 3294 individual households.

Formerly, Baliya  was a village development committee (VDC), which were local-level administrative units. In 2017, the government of Nepal restructured local government in line with the 2015 constitution and VDCs were discontinued.

References

External links
UN map of the municipalities of Kailali District

Populated places in Kailali District